Valentina Aščić (born 12 November 1998) is a Croatian short track speed skater. She competed at the 2022 Winter Olympics, in Women's 500 metres, and Women's 1500 metres.

References 

1998 births
Croatian female short track speed skaters
Living people
Short track speed skaters at the 2022 Winter Olympics
Olympic short track speed skaters of Croatia